Leonard George Ablett (10 May 1916 – 19 December 2006) was an Australian rules footballer who played with Richmond in the VFL during the early 1940s.

Ablett joined Richmond from the Victorian town of Myrtleford. He came off the bench as a reserve in Richmond's 1943 premiership side, his last game in the VFL. 

Ablett returned to Myrtleford and was the club's best-and-fairest player in its inaugural Ovens and Murray Football League season in 1950.

The pavilion at Myrtleford's home ground of McNamara Reserve was named after him in 1974. He was the club's first life member and served 20 years as president. Ablett also served as a councillor and president with the Shire of Myrtleford.

Ablett was the uncle of mercurial VFL/AFL footballer Gary Ablett, Sr. and helped recruit him to Myrtleford for one season in 1983. He was the first member of the famous Ablett family to win a premiership.

References

External links 

1916 births
2006 deaths
Len
Australian rules footballers from Victoria (Australia)
Richmond Football Club players
Richmond Football Club Premiership players
Myrtleford Football Club players
People from Myrtleford
One-time VFL/AFL Premiership players